Imad al-Din or Imad ad-Din, also Imad ud-din, is a male Muslim given name meaning "pillar of the religion, faith", composed from the nouns ‘imad, meaning pillar, and al-Din, of the faith. 

This theophoric name is formed from the Arabic male given name Imad.

Other written variants are Imadaddin, Imaduddin, Emadeddin, etc. 

Notable bearers of the name include:

Imad al-Din Zengi (c. 1085–1146), emir of Mosul and Aleppo
Imad ad-Din al-Isfahani (1125–1201), Persian poet and historian
Imadaddin Nasimi (1369–1417), Azerbaijani Ḥurūfī poet
Idris Imad al-Din (1392–1468), head of the Tayyibi Isma'ili community and historian
Imad al-Din Mahmud ibn Mas‘ud Shirazi (mid 16th century), Persian physician
Muhammad Imaduddin I (1580–1648), sultan of the Maldives
Muhammad Imaaduddeen IV (died 1882), sultan of the Maldives
Muhammad Imaaduddeen V (died 1893), sultan of the Maldives
Imad ud-din Lahiz (died 1900), Islamic writer who converted to Christianity
Muhammad Imaaduddeen VI (1868–1932), sultan of the Maldives
Imad-ad-Dean Ahmad (born 1948), American Muslim scholar
Emad El-Din Mohamed Abdel Moneim Fayed, known as Dodi Fayed (1955–1997), Egyptian film producer
Emadeddin Baghi, Iranian journalist and political activist
 Ja'far us Sadiq Imaduddin, Indian Scholar
Imaduddin (ICMI), Indonesian religious and political activist
Imad Eddin Barakat Yarkas, also known as Abu Dahdah, Syrian-born Spaniard sentenced to prison in Spain for his part in the September 11, 2001 attacks

References

Arabic masculine given names